Guy-Noël Tapoko (born 25 December 1968) is a Cameroonian former international footballer who played as a midfielder.

Personal life
Tapoko is the father of the French footballer Kevin Tapoko.

References

1968 births
Living people
Cameroonian footballers
Cameroon international footballers
Panthère du Ndé players
Stade Lavallois players
SC Tinqueux players
Ligue 2 players
Association football midfielders
Cameroonian expatriate footballers
Cameroonian expatriate sportspeople in France
Expatriate footballers in France
1992 African Cup of Nations players